Narod was a Bulgarian socialist publication, which first appeared around 1897/1898. It was a daily published newspaper between 1911 and 1934, and functioned as the central organ of the Bulgarian Social Democratic Workers Party (Broad Socialists) during this period.

References

Daily newspapers published in Bulgaria
Bulgarian-language newspapers
Socialist newspapers
1890s establishments in Bulgaria
Publications established in the 1890s
Defunct newspapers published in Bulgaria